Honeybush is a common name for plants in the southern African genus Cyclopia, which are used to make an herbal tea.

Honeybush may also refer to:
Cuttsia viburnea,  a plant species of rainforests in New South Wales and Queensland in Australia.
Hakea lissocarpha, a plant species from Western Australia
Melianthus major, a plant species from South Africa and naturalised elsewhere
Richea scoparia, a plant species from Tasmania